Itzel González Rodríguez (born 14 August 1994) is a Mexican footballer who plays as a goalkeeper for Liga MX Femenil side Club América and the Mexico women's national team.

College career
González played college soccer for the UC San Diego Tritons between 2012 and 2016, redshirting in 2015.

International career
González was a non-playing squad member for the Mexico women's national under-20 football team at the 2012 FIFA U-20 Women's World Cup.

González made her debut for the senior Mexico women's national team on 15 December 2019, in a 4–0 friendly defeat by Brazil at Estadio Fonte Luminosa in Araraquara.

References

External links
 
 

1994 births
Living people
Sportspeople from Tijuana
Footballers from Baja California
Mexican footballers
Mexican women's footballers
Women's association football goalkeepers
UC San Diego Tritons women's soccer players
Club Tijuana footballers
Sevilla FC (women) players
Liga MX Femenil players
Mexico women's international footballers
Pan American Games competitors for Mexico
Footballers at the 2019 Pan American Games
Mexican expatriate women's footballers
Mexican expatriate sportspeople in the United States
Expatriate women's soccer players in the United States
Mexican expatriate sportspeople in Spain
Expatriate women's footballers in Spain